The Late Cenozoic Ice Age, or Antarctic Glaciation began 33.9 million years ago at the Eocene-Oligocene Boundary and is ongoing. It is Earth's current ice age or icehouse period. Its beginning is marked by the formation of the Antarctic ice sheets.

Six million years after the start of the Late Cenozoic Ice Age, the East Antarctic Ice Sheet had formed, and 14 million years ago it had reached its current extent.

In the last three million years, glaciations have spread to the northern hemisphere. It commenced with Greenland becoming increasingly covered by an ice sheet in late Pliocene (2.9-2.58 Ma ago) During the Pleistocene Epoch (starting 2.58 Ma ago), the Quaternary glaciation developed with decreasing mean temperatures and increasing amplitudes between glacials and interglacials. During the glacial periods of the Pleistocene, large areas of northern North America and northern Eurasia have been covered by ice sheets.

History of discovery and naming

German naturalist Karl Friedrich Schimper coined the term , meaning ice age, in 1837.  For a long time, the term referred only to glacial periods. Over time, this developed into the concept that they were all part of a much longer ice age.

The concept that the earth is currently in an ice age that began around 30 million years ago can be dated back to at least 1966.

As a geologic time period, the Late Cenozoic Ice Age was used at least as early as 1973.

The climate before the polar ice caps

The last greenhouse period began 260 million years ago during the late Permian Period at the end of the Karoo Ice Age. It lasted all through the time of the non-avian dinosaurs during the Mesozoic Era, and ended 33.9 million years ago in the middle of the Cenozoic Era (the current Era). This greenhouse period lasted 226.1 million years.

The hottest part of the last greenhouse earth was the Late Paleocene - Early Eocene. This was a hothouse period that lasted from 65 to 55 million years ago. The hottest part of this torrid age was the Paleocene–Eocene Thermal Maximum, 55.5 million years ago. Average global temperatures were around 30 °C (86 °F). This was only the second time that Earth reached this level of warmth since the Precambrian. The other time was during the Cambrian Period, which ran from 538.8 million years ago to 485.4 million years ago.

During the early Eocene, Australia and South America were connected to Antarctica.

53 million years ago during the Eocene Epoch, summer high temperatures in Antarctica were around 25 °C (77 °F). Temperatures during winter were around 10 °C (50 °F). It did not frost during the winter. The climate was so warm that trees grew in Antarctica. Arecaceae (palm trees) grew on the coastal lowlands, and Fagus (beech trees) and Pinophyta (conifers) grew on the hills just inland from the coast.

As the global climate became cooler, the planet was seeing a decrease in forests, and an increase in savannas. Animals were evolving to have a larger body size.

Glaciation of the southern hemisphere

Australia drifted away from Antarctica forming the Tasmanian Passage, and South America drifted away from Antarctica forming the Drake Passage. This caused the formation of the Antarctic Circumpolar Current, a current of cold water surrounding Antarctica. This current still exists today, and is a major reason for why Antarctica has such an exceptionally cold climate.

The Eocene-Oligocene Boundary 33.9 million years ago was the transition from the last greenhouse period to the present icehouse climate. At this point, when ~25% more of Antarctica's surface was above sea level and able to support land-based ice sheets relative to today, CO2 levels had dropped to 750 ppm. This was the beginning of the Late Cenozoic Ice Age. This was when the ice sheets reached the ocean, the defining point.

33 million years ago was the evolution of the thylacinid marsupial (Badjcinus).

The first balanids, cats, eucalypts, and pigs came about 30 million years ago. The brontothere and embrithopod mammals went extinct at this time.

At 29.2 million years ago, there were three ice caps in the high elevations of Antarctica. One ice cap formed in the Dronning Maud Land. Another ice cap formed in the Gamburtsev Mountain Range. Another ice cap formed in the Transantarctic Mountains. At this point, the ice caps weren't very big yet. Most of Antarctica wasn't covered by ice.

By 28.7 million years ago, the Gamburtsev ice cap was now much larger due to the colder climate.

CO2 continued to fall and the climate continued to get colder. At 28.1 million years ago, the Gamburtsev and Transantarctic ice caps merged into a main central ice cap. At this point, ice was now covering a majority of the continent.

28 million years ago was the time period in which the largest land mammal existed, the Paraceratherium.

The Dronning Maud ice cap merged with the main ice cap 27.9 million years ago. This was the formation of the East Antarctic Ice Sheet.

25 million years ago brought about the first deer. It also was the time period in which the largest flying bird existed, the Pelagornis sandersi.

Global refrigeration set in 22 million years ago.

20 million years ago brought about the first bears, giraffes, giant anteaters, and hyenas. There was also an increase in the diversity of birds.

The first bovids, kangaroos, and mastodons came about 15 million years ago. This was the warmest part of the Late Cenozoic Ice Age, with average global temperatures around 18.4 °C (65.1 °F). Atmospheric CO2 levels were around 700 ppm. This time period was called the Mid-Miocene Climatic Optimum (MMCO).

By 14 million years ago, the Antarctic ice sheets were similar in size and volume to present times. Glaciers were starting to form in the mountains of the Northern Hemisphere.

The Great American Interchange began 9.5 million years ago (with the highest rate of species crossing occurring around 2.7 million years ago). This was the migration of different land and freshwater animals between North and South America. During this time, armadillos, glyptodonts, ground sloths, hummingbirds, meridiungulates, opossums, and phorusrhacids migrated from South America to North America. Also, bears, deer, coatis, ferrets, horses, jaguars, otters, saber-toothed cats, skunks, and tapirs migrated from North America to South America.

Around 7 million years ago, the first potential hominin, Sahelanthropus is estimated to have lived.

The australopithecines first appear in the fossil record around 4 million years ago, and diversified vastly over the next 2 million years. The Mediterranean Sea was dry between 6 and 5 million years ago.

Five million years ago brought about the first hippopotami and tree sloths. Elephants, zebras, and other grazing herbivores became more diverse. Lions, members of the genus Canis, and other large carnivores became more diverse. The burrowing rodents, birds, kangaroos, small carnivores, and vultures increase in size. There was a decrease in the number of perissodactyl mammals, and the nimravid carnivores went extinct.

The first mammoths came about 4.8 million years ago.

The evolution of the Australopithecus occurred four million years ago. This was also the time of the largest freshwater turtle, Stupendemys. The first modern elephants, gazelles, giraffes, lions, rhinoceros, and zebras came about at this time.

Between 3.6 and 3.4 million years ago, there was a sudden but brief warming period.

Glaciation of the northern hemisphere

The glaciation of the Arctic in the Northern Hemisphere commenced with Greenland becoming increasingly covered by an ice sheet in late Pliocene (2.9-2.58 Ma ago).

The evolution of the Paranthropus occurred 2.7 million years ago.

2.58 million years ago was the official start of the Quaternary glaciation, the current phase of the Late Cenozoic Ice Age. Throughout the Pleistocene, there have been glacial periods (cold periods with extended glaciation) and interglacial periods (warm periods with less glaciation).

The term stadial is another word for glacial period, and interstadial is another word for interglacial period.

The oscillation between glacial and interglacial periods is due to the Milankovitch cycles. These are cycles that have to do with Earth's axial tilt and orbital eccentricity.

Earth is currently tilted at 23.5 degrees. Over a 41,000 year cycle, the tilt oscillates between 22.1 and 24.5 degrees. When the tilt is greater (high obliquity), the seasons are more extreme. During times when the tilt is less (low obliquity), the seasons are less extreme. Less tilt also means that the polar regions receive less light from the sun. This causes a colder global climate as ice sheets start to build up.

The shape of Earth's orbit around the sun affects the Earth's climate. Over a 100,000 year cycle, Earth oscillates between having a circular orbit to having a more elliptical orbit.

From 2.58 million years ago to about 1.73 million ± 50,000 years ago, the degree of axial tilt was the main cause of glacial and interglacial periods.

2.5 million years ago brought about the evolution of the earliest Smilodon species.

Homo habilis appeared about two million years ago. This is the first named species of the genus Homo, although this classification is increasingly controversial. Conifer trees became more diverse in the high latitudes. The ancestor of cattle evolved in India, the Bos primigenus (aurochs).

Australopithecines are estimated to have become extinct around 1.7 million years ago.

The evolution of Homo antecessor occurred 1.2 million years ago. Paranthropus also became extinct.

Around 850,000 ± 50,000 years ago, the degree of orbital eccentricity became the main driver of glacial and interglacial periods rather than the degree of tilt, and this pattern continues to present-day.

800,000 years ago, the short-faced bear (Arctodus simus) became abundant in North America.

The evolution of the Homo heidelbergensis happened 600,000 years ago.

The evolution of Neanderthals occurred 350,000 years ago.

300,000 years ago, Gigantopithicus went extinct.

250,000 years ago in Africa were the first anatomically modern humans.

Last Glacial Period

The Last Glacial Period began 115,000 years ago and ended 11,700 years ago. This time period saw the great advancement of polar ice sheets into the middle latitudes of the Northern Hemisphere.

The Toba eruption 75,000 years ago in present day Sumatra, Indonesia has been linked to a bottleneck in the human DNA. The six to ten years of cold weather during the volcanic winter destroyed many food sources and greatly reduced the human population.

50,000 years ago, Homo sapiens migrated out of Africa. They began replacing other Hominins in Asia. They also began replacing Neanderthals in Europe. However some of the Homo sapiens and Neanderthals interbred. Currently, persons of European descent are two to four percent Neanderthal. With the exception of this small amount of Neanderthal DNA that exists today, Neanderthals became extinct 30,000 years ago.

The Last Glacial Maximum ran from 26,500 years ago to 20,000 years ago. Although different ice sheets reached maximum extent at somewhat different times, this was the time when ice sheets overall were at maximum extent.

According to Blue Marble 3000 (a video by the Zurich University of Applied Sciences), the average global temperature around 19,000 BCE (about 21,000 years ago) was 9.0 °C (48.2 °F). This is about 4.8 °C (8.6 °F) colder than the 1850-1929 average, and 6.0 °C (10.8 °F) colder than the 2011-2020 average.

The figures given by the Intergovernmental Panel On Climate Change (IPCC) estimate a slightly lower global temperature than the figures given by the Zurich University of Applied Sciences. However, these figures are not exact figures and are open more to interpretation. According to the IPCC, average global temperatures increased by 5.5 ± 1.5 °C (9.9 ± 2.7 °F) since the last glacial maximum, and the rate of warming was about 10 times slower than that of the 20th century. It appears that they are defining the present as the early period of instrumental records when temperatures were less affected by human activity, but they do not specify exact years, or give a temperature for the present.

Berkeley Earth publishes a list of average global temperatures by year. It shows that temperatures were stable from the beginning of records in 1850 until 1929.  The average temperature during these years was 13.8 °C (56.8 °F). When subtracting 5.5 ± 1.5 °C (9.9 ± 2.7 °F) from the 1850-1929 average, the average temperature for the last glacial maximum comes out to 8.3 ± 1.5 °C (46.9 ± 2.7 °F). This is about 6.7 ± 1.5 °C (12.0 ± 2.7 °F) colder than the 2011-2020 average. This figure is open to interpretation because the IPCC does not specify 1850-1829 as being the present, or give any exact set of years as being the present. It also does not state whether or not they agree with the figures given by Berkeley Earth.

According to the United States Geographical Survey (USGS), permanent summer ice covered about 8% of Earth's surface and 25% of the land area during the last glacial maximum. The USGS also states that sea level was about 125 m (410 ft) lower than in present times (2012). The volume of ice on Earth was around 17,000,000 mi3 (71,000,000 km3), which is about 2.1 times Earth's current volume of ice.

The extinction of the woolly rhinoceros (Coelodonta antiquitus) occurred 15,000 years ago after the last glacial maximum.

Current Interglacial Period

The Earth is currently in an interglacial period which began 11,700 years ago. This is traditionally referred to as the Holocene epoch and is currently (as of 2018) recognized as such by the International Commission on Stratigraphy. However, there is debate as to whether it is actually a separate epoch or merely an interglacial period within the Pleistocene epoch. This period can also be referred to as the Flandrian interglacial or Flandrian stage.

According to Blue Marble 3000, the average global temperature at the beginning of the current interglacial period was around 12.9 °C (55.2 °F).

Agriculture began 11,500 years ago.

Equidae, giant ground sloths, and short-faced bears became extinct 11,000 years ago.

The Smilodon became extinct 10,000 years ago, as well as the mainland species of the woolly mammoth.

Between 9,000 and 5,000 years ago was the Holocene climatic optimum.  According to Blue Marble 3000, in 6,000 BCE, the average global temperature was 14.2 °C (57.6 °F).  This was a warmer period than when instrumental records began in the 19th century, but now it's cooler than the present.  The giant lemur went extinct around this time.

Around 3,200 BCE (5,200 years ago) the first writing system was invented. It was the cuneiform script used in Mesopotamia (present day Iraq).

The last mammoths at Wrangel Island off the coast of Siberia went extinct around 3,700 years ago.

Being in an interglacial, there is less ice than there was during the last glacial period. However, the last glacial period was just one part of the ice age that still continues today. Even though Earth is in an interglacial, there is still more ice than times outside of ice ages. There are also currently ice sheets in the Northern Hemisphere, which means that there is more ice on Earth than there was during the first 31 million years of the Late Cenozoic Ice Age. During that time, only the Antarctic ice sheets existed. Currently (as of 2012), about 3.1% of Earth's surface and 10.7% of the land area is covered in year-round ice according to the USGS. The total volume of ice presently on Earth is about 33,000,000 km3 (8,000,000 mi3) (as of 2004). The current sea level (as of 2009) is 70 m (230 ft) lower than it would be without the ice sheets of Antarctica and Greenland.

Based on the Milankovitch cycles, the current interglacial period is predicted to be unusually long, continuing for another 25,000 to 50,000 years beyond present times. There are also high concentrations of greenhouse gases in the atmosphere from human activity, and it is almost certain to get higher in the coming decades. This will lead to higher temperatures. In 25,000 to 50,000 years, the climate will begin to cool due to the Milankovich cycles. However, the high levels of greenhouse gases are predicted to keep it from getting cold enough to build up enough ice to meet the criteria of a glacial period. This would effectively extend the current interglacial period an additional 100,000 years placing the next glacial period 125,000 to 150,000 years in the future.

See also
 Azolla event, the hypothesis that Azolla ferns triggered the Late Cenozoic Ice Age
 Beringia, the land that connected Eurasia and North America during the last glacial period
 Bølling–Allerød interstadial, a warm period toward the end of the last glacial period
 Cat gap, a gap in the North American cat fossil record 25 to 18.5 million years ago
 Eemian, the last interglacial period
 Louis Agassiz, a Swiss-American biologist and geologist who helped develop glacial theory
 Marine isotope stages, the names of past climate periods
 Penultimate Glacial Period, the second to last glacial period
 Proailurus, an early cat or cat-like animal that lived 25 million years ago
 Timeline of the evolutionary history of life
 Timeline of human evolution
 Weichselian glaciation, the glaciation of Scandinavia and northern Europe during the last glacial period
 Wisconsin glaciation, the glaciation of North America during the last glacial period
 Würm glaciation, the glaciation of the Alps during the last glacial period
 Younger Dryas, a return to glacial conditions around 7 thousand years after the end of last glacial maximum

References

External links
 Blue Marble 3000, an animation by Zurich University of Applied Sciences showing global ice sheets from 19,000 BCE to 3000 CE

History of Antarctica
Antarctic region
Aquitanian (stage)
Burdigalian
Calabrian (stage)
Cenozoic
Chattian
Gelasian
Holocene
Ice ages
Langhian
Late Pleistocene
Middle Pleistocene
Messinian
Miocene
Neogene
Oligocene
Paleogene
Phanerozoic
Piacenzian
Pleistocene
Pliocene
Quaternary
Rupelian
Serravallian
Tortonian
Zanclean